The A421 is an important road for east/west journeys across south central England.  Together with the A428, the A43 and A34, it forms the route from Cambridge through Milton Keynes to Oxford.  The section between the A1 (near St Neots) and the A5 (in Milton Keynes) is a national primary route.

Route
The road begins at the A1, just south of St Neots (and the junction with the A428 from Cambridge), at the Black Cat Roundabout. The road bypasses both Great Barford and Bedford to the south to reach the M1 at junction 13. From there, it swings up through the southern part of Milton Keynes, doubling as the local grid road H8 Standing Way. During this time it crosses the A5 (and connects to it via a short spur which is part of the V6 Grafton Street).

Continuing westwards, as the route approaches Buckingham the road passes close by to the 14th century Thornborough Bridge, the only surviving mediaeval bridge in Buckinghamshire which was bypassed by the new bridge in 1974. Close to here, it then forms the Buckingham by-pass before joining the A43 (Northampton  M40 junction 10) near Brackley. (On crossing the A43, the route due westward becomes the B4031 through Croughton, Aynho and Deddington to join the A361 to Chipping Norton).

The section from the A1 to the M1 is dual carriageway and fully grade-separated, with the section between Bedford and the M1 completed in December 2010, winning the British Construction Industry Award in 2011.

As of October 2020, the section from junction 13 of the M1 to the south-western flank of Milton Keynes is a dual carriageway. Upon leaving Milton Keynes, the section of road to the A43 is a single carriageway, with the exception of the bypass around Tingewick.

Developments

M1 Junction 13 to Milton Keynes 
In conjunction with the M1 widening schemes and dualling of the A421 between M1 Junction 13 and the A1 near St Neots (see above), proposals were made to widen the A421 between the M1 junction 13 in Bedfordshire and the Kingston roundabout in Milton Keynes. Exhibitions were held in June 2005 which rejected proposals to re-route the road in favour of widening the current road. In 2005 the project was given an estimated total cost of £33 million.

Funding of £23.5 million was confirmed by the government for these works, as part of the South East Midlands Local Enterprise Partnership "Local Growth Deal". As part of the government's pinch point reduction programme, in 2014 work commenced on the A421 in Milton Keynes to improve the Kingston roundabout, and dual the section from it to (near) the Bedfordshire border, with the construction of two new roundabouts on the route. The road corridor includes a separate cycleway.

The upgrade work for this final phase of the plan, the section running from junction 13 to Eagle Farm roundabout, started in September 2018 and was completed in December 2020.

A1M11/A14 link
In the "Road investment strategy" announced to Parliament by the Department for Transport and Secretary of State for Transport on 1 December 2014, planning would begin to dual the section between the A1 and the A1198 at Caxton Gibbet. The announcement said that the A1/A421 Black Cat Roundabout would be replaced with a grade-separated junction, just a few years after this roundabout was expensively upgraded. The link would provide an uninterrupted dual carriageway route between the M1 (at Junction 13) and the M11/A14 (at Junction 14 and 31) near Cambridge.

In September 2021, National Highways announced that this new section of dual carriageway will be designated A421. The announcement does not say whether the section between the A1198 and the A14/M11 junction will also be renumbered, which would create a single designation for the entire route between these junctions.

Oxford to Cambridge Expressway

The Oxford to Cambridge Expressway was a proposed grade-separated dual carriageway between the A34 near Oxford and the A14 near Cambridge, via (or near) Milton Keynes. The proposal aimed to establish this route by linking existing roads and building new ones. The case for its creation was examined in a Strategic Study for the Cambridge – Milton Keynes – Oxford corridor, published by National Infrastructure Commission in November 2016. The NIC saw the road as being of national strategic importance by providing an outer orbital route around London, linking Southampton, the M3, M4, M40, M1, A1, A14/M11 and Felixstowe. Had this plan been realised, it would have replaced the current congested single carriageway road between West Bletchley and the A43.

In March 2021, Transport Secretary Grant Shapps cancelled the plan, citing analysis that showed that its costs would exceed its benefits.

Notable events

Five seconds of fame
The A421 Tingewick bypass has a minor claim to fame as the location of the then fastest speeding incident ever recorded by British police, in March 2003. Both were convicted of dangerous driving, imprisoned for 28 days and banned from driving for two years (with a compulsory re-test).

Blind driver
Blind Martine Brooks drove along the newly constructed A421 Great Barford Bypass (From the A1 Black Cat Roundabout to Bedford) and back to raise money for charity. The drive took place two days before the official road opening, and she was accompanied by Frank Branston (Mayor of Bedford), Steve Clarke (Teacher and Navigator), and Denise Hubbard (Driving Instructor and Car Owner).

She reached a speed of  before doing a flawless three point turn, and returning to the A1.

References

External links
 The Great Barford (A421) Driving Challenge
 Highways Agency response to a query about widening the Berry Farm Underpass to allow for the canal (made under the 'Freedom of Information Act') 

Roads in England
Roads in Oxfordshire
Roads in Buckinghamshire
Roads in Milton Keynes
Roads in Bedfordshire